This is the list of the railway stations in Apulia owned by:
 Rete Ferroviaria Italiana (RFI), a branch of the Italian state company Ferrovie dello Stato;
 Ferrovie del Sud Est (FSE), a branch of the Italian state company Ferrovie dello Stato;
 Ferrovie Appulo Lucane (FAL);
 Ferrovie del Gargano (FG);
 Ferrotramviaria (FNB).

RFI stations

FSE stations

FAL stations

FG stations

FNB stations

See also

Railway stations in Italy
Ferrovie dello Stato
Rail transport in Italy
High-speed rail in Italy
Transport in Italy

References

External links

 
Apu